4 Heartbreakers Only is an EP by Danish rock band Warm Guns, released in 1982. 

The EP includes three new recordings and the previously released "The Young Go First". Danish singer Peter Belli recorded "Can't Give Or Take Anymore" in 1991 on the album "Yeah" with Danish lyrics as "Alt Hvad Jeg Har Kært" (Everything I Hold Dear).

Track listing

Side 1 
 "Can't Give or Take Anymore"  (Muhl) – 3:26
 "Wild Life"  (Muhl) – 2:19

Side 2 
 "The Young Go First"  (Muhl) – 4:23
 "Heart of Stone"  (Jagger/Richards) – 2:46

Personnel 
 Lars Muhl – vocals, keyboards
 Lars Hybel – guitars
 Kaj Weber – bass
 Troels Møller – drums
 Jacob Perbøll – bass ("The Young Go First")
 Jens G. Nielsen – drums ("The Young Go First")

Notes

References 
Muhl, Lars (1993): Sjæl I Flammer. Hovedland

External links 
 Discogs.com

1982 debut EPs
Warm Guns albums
Vertigo Records EPs